The following is a list of Puerto Rican comedians which includes comedians who were born in Puerto Rico, comedians who are of full or partial Puerto Rican ancestry, and many long-term residents and/or immigrants of other ethnic heritages who have made Puerto Rico their home and happen to be comedians as well.

Comedians

José Miguel Agrelot
Raymond Arrieta
Alba Raquel Barros
Yoyo Boing
Lou Briel
Norma Candal
Awilda Carbia
Shorty Castro
Melwin Cedeño
Dagmar
Lillian Hurst
Juan Manuel Lebrón
Machuchal
Ángela Meyer
René Monclova
Luis Raúl
Carmen Belen Richardson
Ramón "Diplo" Rivero
Luisito Vigoreaux
Otilio Warrington

See also

 List of Puerto Ricans
List of comedians

References

Puerto Rican
Comedians